Master of Disaster is an album by American singer-songwriter John Hiatt. It was released on June 21, 2005 via New West Records. Recording sessions took place at Ardent Studio "C" in Memphis, Tennessee. Production was handled by Jim Dickinson. It features contributions from the North Mississippi Allstars, David Hood, Jim Spake, Jeff Callaway, Scott Thompson, Joe Sallmanberger, "T-Bone" Tommy Burroughs and Jim Dickinson. The album peaked at number 126 on the Billboard 200 and number 10 on the Independent Albums in the United States.

Critic reception

The album was met with generally favorable reviews from music critics. At Metacritic, which assigns a normalized rating out of 100 to reviews from mainstream publications, the album received an average score of 70, based on eight reviews. AllMusic's Mark Deming wrote: "while Hiatt sounds soulful as all get out (as per usual) on this set, the lingering mood is often downbeat and introspective". Steve Horowitz of PopMatters wrote: "the tunes would be a whole lot better with careful pruning".

Track listing

Personnel
John Hiatt – songwriter, vocals, guitar
Luther Dickinson – guitar
David Hood – bass guitar
Cody Dickinson – drums
Jim "East Memphis Slim" Dickinson – keyboards, producer
Jim Spake – saxophone
Jeff Callaway – trombone
Scott Thompson – trumpet
Joe Sallmanberger – tuba
Thomas "T-Bone Tommy" Burroughs – violin
John Hampton – recording and mixing
Doug Sax – mastering
Robert Hadley – mastering
Erik Von Weber – photography
Mark Lipson – photography

Charts

References

External links

2005 albums
John Hiatt albums
New West Records albums
Albums produced by Jim Dickinson